Teluk Kuantan (also known as Koto Taluk) is a town and the seat of Kuantan Singingi Regency, Riau province, Indonesia.

Climate
Teluk Kuantan has a tropical rainforest climate (Af) with heavy rainfall year-round.

References

Regency seats of Riau